Levis is a commune in the Yonne department in Bourgogne-Franche-Comté in north-central France. It lies on the boundary between the natural regions of Puisaye and Forterre.

See also
Communes of the Yonne department

References

Communes of Yonne